Sensualità a corte is an Italian television series.

See also
List of Italian television series

External links
 

Italian television series
2005 Italian television series debuts
2012 Italian television series endings
2010s Italian television series